Blessed Sacrament Catholic Church is a Catholic church in the Glebe neighbourhood of Ottawa, Ontario, Canada. The parish was founded on March 25, 1913, with the first building being a simple chapel. The current building at 194 Fourth Avenue, was built in 1931.

History
A brass memorial plaque was erected by the Blessed Sacrament parish in memory of parishioners and comrades of the overseas military forces of Canada. It was unveiled on Armistice Day (11 November) 1920 by Reverent John J. O'Gorman, P.P. 
When the current building opened in 1932, its plain design and lack of ornamentation caused local controversy because it seemed more Protestant than Catholic. However, the building later won plaudits for its modern design. Designed by John Gibb Morton, it is considered an example of the Perpendicular Gothic style.

A memorial organ was unveiled on Christmas 1946, in memory of the parishioners who gave their lives in World War II.

As with Ottawa's other old churches, declining church attendance had caused problems for the church. For several years it served as home to Ottawa's Hungarian Catholic community, though they left in 1997. Church attendance began to increase dramatically when Ottawa Archbishop Marcel Gervais appointed the popular priest Fr. Joseph (Joe) LeClair as pastor. Fr Galen Bank was installed as pastor at Blessed Sacrament in July 2013. Father Galen, along with Associate Pastor Fr Francis Donnelly, have followed in the footsteps of Blessed Sacrament's founder Fr. O'Gorman by reaching out to and working with the parish community.

The church's parish retains its original form. It covers the area north and west of the Rideau Canal, south of the Queensway and east of Booth Street.

Gallery

References

External links 
Official website

Roman Catholic churches completed in 1913
Roman Catholic churches in Ottawa
Gothic Revival architecture in Ottawa
Roman Catholic churches in Ontario
Hungarian-Canadian culture
Gothic Revival church buildings in Canada
1913 establishments in Ontario
20th-century churches in Canada